Hong Wei (born 4 October 1989) is a Chinese professional badminton player. He competed at the 2016 Rio in the men's doubles event, and placed fourth after losing the bronze medal match to Great Britain pair Chris Langridge and Marcus Ellis.

Achievements

BWF World Championships 
Men's doubles

Asian Championships 
Men's doubles

Mixed doubles

BWF Superseries 
The BWF Superseries, which was launched on 14 December 2006 and implemented in 2007, is a series of elite badminton tournaments, sanctioned by the Badminton World Federation (BWF). BWF Superseries levels are Superseries and Superseries Premier. A season of Superseries consists of twelve tournaments around the world that have been introduced since 2011. Successful players are invited to the Superseries Finals, which are held at the end of each year.

Men's doubles

  BWF Superseries Finals tournament
  BWF Superseries Premier tournament
  BWF Superseries tournament

BWF Grand Prix 
The BWF Grand Prix had two levels, the BWF Grand Prix and Grand Prix Gold. It was a series of badminton tournaments sanctioned by the Badminton World Federation (BWF) which was held from 2007 to 2017.

Men's doubles

  BWF Grand Prix Gold tournament
  BWF Grand Prix tournament

References

External links 
 
 

1989 births
Living people
People from Xiamen
Badminton players from Fujian
Chinese male badminton players
Badminton players at the 2016 Summer Olympics
Olympic badminton players of China